Alison Wendlandt is an American chemist who is an assistant professor at the Massachusetts Institute of Technology. Her research considers the development of catalysts for organic synthesis.

Early life and education 
Wendlandt is from Colorado. She earned her bachelor's degree in chemistry at the University of Chicago. She was started a Master's degree at Yale University. Her graduate research had initially considered chemical biology: how certain molecules interact human health. During her research she became more interested in reaction processes and what she could do to make them more efficient. She moved to Wisconsin for her doctoral studies, where she worked alongside Shannon Stahl on the development of catalysts that mediate amine oxidation. She then joined Harvard University as a postdoctoral fellow working alongside Eric Jacobsen.

Research and career 
In 2018, Wendlandt joined the Department of Chemistry at Massachusetts Institute of Technology. She works on the development of catalysts for organic chemistry. In particular, she develops dual catalysts for selective synthesis. Wendlandt used an enzyme from Streptomyces fradiae to drive the conversion of rare sugar isomers. This simple one-ste reaction allowed for the conversion of D-Glucose to D-allose (a potential candidate for low-calorie sweetners) with a 40% yield.

Wendlandt showed that a combination of polyanionic tungsten and disulfide could be used to drive enantioselective reactions. The dual catalyst approach allowed her to make a breakthrough in alkene isomerization, making it possible to precisely control the interconversion of alkene regioisomers.

Awards and honors 
 2019 Cecil and Ida Green Career Development Professorship
 2020 Thieme Medical Publishers Chemistry Journal Award
 2021 Beckman Young Investigators Award
 2021 National Institutes of Health New Innovator Award

Selected publications

Personal life 
Wendlandt is queer, and was included as one of Chemical & Engineering News' Trailblazers in 2021. In an interview, Wendlandt described her experience of being LGBTQ+ in science, “I think being different, whatever that means — in my case, being LGBTQ — has been like a superpower,”.

References 

Year of birth missing (living people)
Living people
American women chemists
21st-century American chemists
21st-century American women scientists
Scientists from Colorado
University of Chicago alumni
Yale University alumni
Harvard University people
Massachusetts Institute of Technology faculty
Queer scientists
LGBT people from Colorado